Vochysia is a genus of plant in the family Vochysiaceae. It contains the following species, among many others:
 Vochysia aurifera, Standl. & L.O. Williams
 Vochysia haenkeana

References

Vochysiaceae
Myrtales genera
Taxonomy articles created by Polbot